"Intergalactic" is a song by American rap rock group Beastie Boys. "Intergalactic" was released as the first single from their fifth studio album, Hello Nasty, on June 2, 1998. The single reached number 28 on the US Billboard Hot 100, making it the band's third top-40 single, and reached number five on the UK Singles Chart, where it remains the band's biggest hit. It received a Grammy Award for Best Rap Performance by a Duo or Group in 1999.

Music video
The "Intergalactic" video was directed by Adam Yauch under the pseudonym Nathanial Hörnblowér. The storyline revolves around a giant robot causing destruction by fighting a giant octopus-headed creature in a city while popping, a parody of, or tribute to, Japanese Kaiju films (specifically the series finale of Johnny Sokko and his Flying Robot). Various scenes are filmed in the Shibuya and Shinjuku train stations in Tokyo, Japan; the Tokyo Metropolitan Government Building No. 1 makes a brief appearance. Throughout the video, the band wear bright uniforms of (Koji) Japanese street construction workers. The music video was added to MTV on the week ending June 14, 1998. The video was a regular on Total Request Live and won the award for Best Hip-Hop Video at the 1999 MTV Video Music Awards. Beastie Boys performed "Three MC's and One DJ" and "Intergalactic" at the 1998 MTV Video Music Awards.

The music video also somewhat parodies Japanese Super Sentai shows, which are the basis for Power Rangers and ranked number 64 on MuchMusic's 100 Best Videos. Complex wrote that, "We get the feeling Godzilla creator Tomoyuki Tanaka, who passed the year before the 'Intergalactic' single was released, would be proud."

Track listings
CD single 1
 "Intergalactic" (album version) – 3:33
 "Hail Sagan (Special K)" – 4:06
 "Intergalactic" (Prisoners of Technology Mix) – 5:46
 "Intergalactic" (Fuzzy Logic Re-Mix) – 3:47

CD single 2
 "Intergalactic" (album version) – 3:32
 "Intergalactic" (Remix No. 1) – 3:54
 "Intergalactic" (Remix No. 2) – 4:02
 "Intergalactic" (Remix No. 1 Instrumental) – 3:56
 "Intergalactic" (Remix No. 2 Instrumental) – 3:59

Charts

Weekly charts

Year-end charts

Certifications

Release history

References

1998 singles
1998 songs
Beastie Boys songs
Capitol Records singles
Grand Royal singles
Music videos directed by Adam Yauch
Science fiction music
Song recordings produced by Mario Caldato Jr.
Songs written by Ad-Rock
Songs written by Adam Yauch
Songs written by Mario Caldato Jr.
Songs written by Mike D